UOG may refer to:
University of Guam
University of Gujrat
Papua New Guinea University Of Goroka